Raveniella is a genus of spiders in the family Anapidae. It was first described in 2010 by Rix & Harvey. , it contains 9 Australian species.

Species

Raveniella comprises the following species:
Raveniella apopsis Rix & Harvey, 2010
Raveniella arenacea Rix & Harvey, 2010
Raveniella cirrata Rix & Harvey, 2010
Raveniella hickmani (Forster, 1959)
Raveniella janineae Rix & Harvey, 2010
Raveniella luteola (Hickman, 1945)
Raveniella mucronata Rix & Harvey, 2010
Raveniella peckorum Rix & Harvey, 2010
Raveniella subcirrata Rix & Harvey, 2010

References

Anapidae
Araneomorphae genera
Spiders of Australia